Whitehill is a hamlet to the south of Faversham in Kent, England. A stream rises at Westbrook, a small distance south of Whitehill. At the 2011 Census, the population was included in the civil parish of Ospringe.

External links

Villages in Kent